Thames Centre is a municipality in Middlesex County, Ontario, Canada, directly east of the City of London. It was formed on January 1, 2001, when the townships of West Nissouri and North Dorchester were amalgamated. It is part of the London census metropolitan area.

Thames Centre includes the Degree Confluence of 43N 81W.

Communities
Communities in the township include:  Avon, Belton, Cherry Grove, Crampton, Cobble Hill, Derwent, Devizes, Dorchester, Evelyn, Fanshawe Lake, Friendly Corners, Gladstone, Harrietsville, Kelly Station, Mossley, Nilestown, Oliver, Putnam, Salmonville, Silvermoon, Thorndale (mayor - John Fluttert), Three Bridges, and Wellburn.

Dorchester 

Dorchester is the residential and commercial core of the township.

Demographics 

See also
Lake Whitaker
List of townships in Ontario

References

External links

Lower-tier municipalities in Ontario
Municipalities in Middlesex County, Ontario